Frozen Ghost is the debut album of the band Frozen Ghost, released in 1987. Its first single, "Should I See" (a song about censorship) reached #69 on the Billboard Hot 100.

The run-out groove of side two on the LP contains unintelligible speech. When played backwards, a voice (presumably Arnold Lanni's) says, "You are ruining your needle!"

The cover picture was taken in Scarborough, Ontario (a suburb of Toronto) at the foot of the Scarborough Bluffs.

Track listing 
All songs written by Arnold Lanni.
"Should I See" - 3:48
"Promises" - 3:50
"Beware the Masque" - 4:00
"Yum Bai Ya" - 3:55
"Love Like a Fire" - 4:07
"End of the Line" - 3:32
"Time is the Answer" - 4:01
"Love Without Lies" - 4:11
"Soldiers Cry" - 3:36
"Truth in Lies" - 4:20

Singles
The following singles were released from the album, with the highest charting positions listed.

 The b-side of the "Should I See" single was the song "Suspended Humanation".  It would later appear on their second album Nice Place to Visit.

Album credits

Personnel
Arnold Lanni - lead vocals, guitars, keyboards, programming
Wolf Hassel - bass, background vocals
with:
Derry Grehan - additional guitar
Tony Moretta - additional guitar
Lenny Mizzoni - saxophone, background vocals
Manu Silvani - female vocal on "Promises"
The Chianti Square singers - Gabe Piersanti, Lenny Mizzoni, Bryan Gagnon, Wolf Hassel, Eric Lawrence, Reeb, Sam

Production
Arnold Lanni - producer
Joe Primeau - engineer
Mixed at the Farmyard Studios, Bucks, England by Stephen W. Tayler
Mastering - George Marino at Sterling Sound, NYC

References

1987 debut albums
Atlantic Records albums
Albums produced by Arnold Lanni
Frozen Ghost albums